Thomas Bignall (8 January 1842 – 19 September 1898) was an English first-class cricketer who played for Nottinghamshire between 1863 and 1878 as a right-handed batsman and very occasional fast bowler.

Notes

External links
 

1842 births
1898 deaths
English cricketers
Nottinghamshire cricketers
Marylebone Cricket Club cricketers
Players cricketers
North v South cricketers
All-England Eleven cricketers
United North of England Eleven cricketers
People from Chilwell
Cricketers from Nottinghamshire
Players of the North cricketers